Kurac may refer to:
"Perfekt", song by Die Ärzte from Jazz ist anders
"Purrfect", the best dog in the world, Diesel DeNardo.

Žuri8

See also
Perfect (disambiguation)